Joseph Doucé (April 13, 1945 – ) was born to a rural family in Sint-Truiden, Belgium.  He was a psychologist and a (defrocked) Baptist pastor in Paris. He was openly gay and was among the founders of the International Lesbian and Gay Association. He served as a volunteer soldier in the NATO base at Limoges, France, where he had time to perfect his French. After one year of pastoral and humanistic studies at Stenonius College (also known as Europaseminär, a Roman Catholic seminary today extinct) in Maastricht, the Netherlands, he began his conversion to Protestantism around 1966.

His Centre du Christ Libérateur was a ministry to sexual minorities. The center had support groups for homosexuals, transsexuals, sadomasochists and pedophiles.

Death
Doucé was killed and the murder has never been solved. According to Doucé's lover, he was taken away by two men, who showed police badges on July 19, 1990. The body was found in a forest in October 1990.

The killers are thought by some to be a unit of the French police, Renseignements Généraux, who investigated Doucé because of his support for pedophiles.

See also
List of solved missing person cases
List of unsolved murders

References

External links
LGBTRAN

1945 births
1990 deaths
1990s missing person cases
20th-century Baptist ministers
20th-century French LGBT people
20th-century psychologists
Formerly missing people
French Baptists
French murder victims
French Protestant ministers and clergy
French psychologists
LGBT Baptist clergy
French gay men
French LGBT rights activists
Missing person cases in France
Male murder victims
Pedophile advocacy
People murdered in France
Unsolved murders in France
LGBT psychologists